AirTag is a tracking device developed by Apple. AirTag is designed to act as a key finder, which helps people find personal objects (e.g. keys, bags, apparel, small electronic devices, vehicles). To locate lost items, AirTags use Apple's crowdsourced Find My network, estimated in early 2021 to consist of approximately one billion devices worldwide that detect and anonymously report emitted Bluetooth signals. AirTags are compatible with any iPhone, iPad, or iPod Touch device capable of running iOS/iPadOS 14.5 or later, including iPhone 6S or later (including iPhone SE 1, 2 and 3). Using the built-in U1 chip on iPhone 11 or later (except iPhone SE models), users can more precisely locate items using UWB (ultra-wideband) technology. AirTag was announced on April 20, 2021, made available for pre-order on April 23, and released on April 30.

History 
The product was rumored to be under development in April 2019. In February 2020, it was reported that Asahi Kasei was prepared to supply Apple with tens of millions of ultra-wideband (UWB) parts for the rumored AirTag in the second and third quarters of 2020, though the shipment was ultimately delayed. On April 2, 2020, a YouTube video on Apple Support page also confirmed AirTag. In Apple's iOS 14.0 release, code was discovered that described the reusable and removable battery that would be used in the AirTag. In March 2021, MacWorld stated that iOS 14.5 beta's Find My user interface included "Items" and "Accessories" features meant for AirTag support for a user's "backpack, luggage, headphones" and other objects. AppleInsider noted that the beta included safety warnings for "unauthorized AirTags" persistently in the user's vicinity.

Features 

AirTags can be interacted with using the Find My app. Users may trigger the AirTag to play a sound from the app. iPhones equipped with the U1 chip can use "Precision Tracking" to provide direction to and precise distance from an AirTag. Precision Tracking utilizes ultra-wideband.

AirTags are not satellite navigation devices. AirTags are located on a map within the Find My app by utilizing Bluetooth signals from other anonymous iOS and iPadOS devices out in the world. To help prevent unwanted tracking, an iOS/iPadOS device will alert their owner if someone else's AirTag seems to be with them, instead of with the AirTag's owner, for too long. If an AirTag is out of range of any Apple device for more than 8 to 24 hours, it will begin to beep to alert a person that an AirTag may have been placed in their possessions.

Users can mark an AirTag as lost and provide a phone number and a message. Any iPhone user can see this phone number and message with the "identify lost item" feature within the Find My app, which utilizes near-field communication (NFC) technology. Additionally, Android and Windows 10 Mobile phones with NFC can identify an AirTag with a tap, which will redirect to a website containing the message and phone number.

AirTag requires an Apple ID and iOS or iPadOS 14.5 or later. It uses the CR2032 button cell, replaceable with one year of battery life (though batteries with child-resistant bitterants cannot be used due to the design of the AirTag battery terminal). The maximum range of Bluetooth tracking is estimated to be around 100 meters. The water-resistance of an AirTag is rated IP67 water and dust; an AirTag can withstand 30 minutes of water immersion in standard laboratory conditions. Each Apple ID is limited to 16 AirTags.

Firmware version history 
Apple provides no way for the user to force AirTag to carry out a firmware update. Firmware updates may happen automatically whenever an AirTag is in range of an iPhone (running iOS 14.5 or later) that it has been paired with, and when both have sufficient battery.

Applications

Tracking Checked Luggage 
AirTags have become extremely popular among travelers to track checked luggage on flights and empower them when luggage is lost by carriers. In response, Lufthansa stated that AirTags were not permissible in luggage checked with the carrier. The carrier backtracked after a risk assessment by German risk authorities following widespread criticism and accusations that it was seeking to avoid accountability. The Federal Aviation Administration has ruled that storing AirTags in checked luggage is permitted and not a safety hazard despite containing batteries.

Stalking ability
Despite Apple's including technologies to help prevent unwanted tracking or stalking, The Washington Post found that it was "frighteningly easy" to bypass the systems put in place. It has been described as 'a gift to stalkers'. Concerns included the built-in audible alarm taking three days to sound, and the fact that most Americans had Android devices that would not receive alerts about nearby AirTags that iPhone devices receive. AirTags cannot have most of their components replaced correctly, but it has been found that AirTags with their speakers forcibly removed from the rest of the components were being used to track people. The AirTag cannot detect this change, making it harder for people to find out that an AirTag had been stalking them. AirTags with their speakers removed have been found for sale on sites like eBay and Etsy. In January 2022, BBC News spoke to six women who stated that they found unregistered AirTags inside things such as cars and bags.

In late 2021, Apple released an app called Tracker Detect on the Google Play Store to help users of Android 9 or later to discover unknown AirTags near them in a "lost" state and potentially being used for malicious tracking purposes. However, the app does not run in the background.

In February 2022, Apple added a warning for users setting up their AirTag, notifying them that using the device to track people is illegal and the device is only meant for tracking personal belongings. It will take between 8-24 hours for an AirTag to chirp if it has been separated from its owner.

Tracking cars 
The National Post in Canada reported that AirTags were placed on vehicles at shopping malls and parking lots without the drivers' knowledge, in order to track them to their homes, where the vehicles would be stolen. In response, Apple announced just before WWDC 2021 that it had begun rolling out updates that would allow anyone with an NFC-capable phone to tap an unwanted AirTag for instructions on how to disable it, and that they had decreased the delay time for the audible alert that sounds after the AirTag is separated from its owner from three days to a random time between 8 and 24 hours.

Theft prevention and recovery 
AirTags have been utilized to track stolen property and assist police in recovering them for return to their rightful owners. In February 2023, a North Carolina family discovered that their car had been stolen. In coordination with local police, they utilized an AirTag placed in the vehicle to locate the car and were able to recover their property. Police were reportedly elated at the ease at which they were able to arrest the criminals and recover the property thanks to the AirTags.

Criticism

Trojan horse 
Users who set their AirTags to lost mode are prompted to provide a contact phone number for finders to call. In September 2021, security researcher Brian Krebs noted that the phone number field will actually accept any type of input, including arbitrary computer code, opening up the potential use of AirTags as Trojan horse devices.

Tile 
Similar product manufacturer Tile criticized Apple for using similar technologies and designs to Tile's trackers. Spokespeople for Tile made a testimony to the United States Congress saying that Apple was supporting "anti-competitive practices", claiming that Apple had done this in the past, and that they think it is "entirely appropriate for Congress to take a closer look at Apple's business practices".

Loop 
AirTags do not have holes or other mechanical features that would allow them to be positively attached or affixed to the item being tracked; solutions include adhesives (glue, tape) and purpose-built accessories. The polyurethane AirTag Loop is the least expensive solution sold by Apple; it costs the same as a single AirTag and has been criticized as an "accessory tax".

See also 
iBeacon
Samsung Galaxy SmartTag

References

External links 

Apple Inc. hardware
Internet object tracking
Apple Inc. peripherals
IPhone accessories